Earth vs. the Spider (a.k.a. The Spider) is an independently made 1958 American black-and-white science fiction horror film produced and directed by Bert I. Gordon, who also provided the plot upon which the screenplay by George Worthing Yates and Laszlo Gorog was based. Though the title suggests a global crisis, the film focuses entirely on a small town being terrorized by a giant spider whose origin is never explained. The film stars Ed Kemmer, June Kenney and Eugene Persson. The special effects were by Bert I. Gordon and Paul Blaisdell. Earth vs. the Spider was released by American International Pictures as a double feature in different film markets with either The Brain Eaters or The Screaming Skull.

Plot
Jack Flynn is driving down a highway at night looking at a bracelet he bought his teenage daughter Carol for her birthday, when his truck hits a massive spider thread. The next morning, Carol is concerned that her ne'er-do-well father did not come home the night before. She convinces her boyfriend Mike to assist in a search. They find his crashed truck and the bracelet. Thinking he may have taken shelter in a nearby cave, they investigate. In the darkness of the cave, they step off a ledge and fall onto the gigantic web of an enormous tarantula, which emerges to attack them. They escape and make it back to town.

The sheriff does not believe Carol and Mike about the giant spider, but their science teacher, Mr. Kingman, persuades him to return to the cave with large amounts of DDT. They find Jack's body, drained of fluids, and spray DDT throughout the cavern to flush out and then kill the spider. The apparently lifeless body of the spider is taken back to town to the high school gym, where Kingman wants to study it, concerned that whatever conditions created it may produce a whole race of giant spiders. A group of teenagers uses the gym to practice rock and roll numbers they are going to play for a school dance. The music awakens the spider and it crashes through the wall of the gym. The janitor, stopping to call the teacher, is killed.
 
The spider terrorizes the town, killing a number of people before heading to Kingman's house, attacking his wife and son. Kingman, in his car, gets the spider's attention and lures it outside of town before escaping and doubling back to confirm that his wife and son are safe.

The spider is spotted returning to its cave. The sheriff and Kingman use dynamite to seal the spider in, but then discover Carol and Mike had gone into the cave to retrieve the bracelet her father had bought her as a final memento of him. A crew is put to work digging into the cave through its ceiling. Kingman acquires a couple of large electrodes from the power company and runs cables to some power lines. In hopes of escaping the spider's reach, Carol and Mike proceed onto a narrow ledge, which collapses behind them, leaving them trapped. The spider descends on a strand of web to get at them. The townspeople arrive and toss one of the electrodes to Mike. Kingman and Mike use the electrodes to electrocute the spider, which falls, impaling itself on stalagmites. Dynamite is again used to seal off the cave, and the sheriff remarks with satisfaction that even should the spider return to life again, it will be trapped and starve to death. However, Kingman fears that curious scientists may again dig up the spider in hopes of studying it.

Cast

Production

The film's original on-screen title was Earth vs. the Spider, but when The Fly (also released in 1958) became a blockbuster, the title was shortened to just The Spider on all of the advertising material. The original screen title, however, was never changed, so the film is frequently referred to by the title Earth vs. the Spider.

The movie theater in which Mike works displays a film poster prominently advertising The Amazing Colossal Man, while the marquee shows that it is currently running Attack of the Puppet People, which happens to also star Kenney. Both of these films were also directed by Gordon. Attack of the Puppet People was the last film Gordon made for American International Pictures for a number of years, with the director claiming that the studio had not paid him appropriately. However, he returned to AIP in the 1970s.

Some of the cave interiors were filmed using stills from Carlsbad Caverns National Park in New Mexico, with live action scenes filmed at Bronson Caves in Griffith Park near Los Angeles. Special effects expert Paul Blaisdell created a life-size giant spider leg to use in the film, as well as a desiccated, mummy-like corpse that was used to represent the Spider's victims in several scenes. The same dummy was used to film both the dead truck driver from the beginning of the film as well as a deputy sheriff; all that was required was a change of clothes on the mannequin.

The film's budget was $100,000.

Reception
Critical response for Earth vs. the Spider has been mixed. Bruce Eder from Allmovie gave the film a positive review, calling it "the most consistently entertaining, if not the best of Bert I. Gordon's various size-oriented fantasy-sci-fi films". However, Eder said that the film's special effects were dated. Writing in DVD Talk, critic Glenn Erickson reported that although the film "[o]ccasionally [...] seems to exist in a different dimension," it "works better than most Bert I. Gordon pix because we basically like the teenaged heroes, even though they're so badly directed that it's hard to believe anything they do," further adding that the film's "non-sequiturs are sheer joy for creature feature fans." Critic Gary Tooze described the film as "weak, even by the genre's low standards, but its does have appeal with its one dimensional characters and limited plot points."

In popular culture
This film was one of many films featured in the third season of the movie-mocking television show Mystery Science Theater 3000.

A short clip of this film can be seen on one of the television sets in the 2002 Disney film Lilo & Stitch.

Shown on the MeTV show Svengoolie on December 25, 2021, and again on New Year's Eve 2022.

References

Bibliography
 Warren, Bill. Keep Watching the Skies: American Science Fiction Films of the Fifties, 21st Century Edition. Jefferson, North Carolina: McFarland & Company, 2009, .

External links

 
 
 

1958 films
American science fiction horror films
1950s English-language films
1950s science fiction horror films
1950s monster movies
Giant monster films
American natural horror films
American International Pictures films
1958 horror films
Films directed by Bert I. Gordon
Films about spiders
Films scored by Albert Glasser
1950s American films